"" (English: "Land of our forefathers") is the national anthem of Togo. In 1979, it was replaced in its capacity by a different composition created by the party of the Rally of the Togolese People. It was readopted in 1992.

Lyrics

French original

In local languages

History

Rally of the Togolese People-era national anthem 
During the Third Republic, the name of the national anthem was changed to "l'UNITÉ NATIONALE". This was the state anthem written by the party of Rally of the Togolese People that, between 1979 and 1992, replaced "Terre de nos aïeux". It was replaced by the old anthem in 1992, due to concerns that patriotism was equated with loyalty to the Rally.

Notes

References

External links 
 Togo: Salut à toi, pays de nos aïeux - Audio of the national anthem of Togo, with information and lyrics (archive link)
 Vocal version
 MP3 version

National anthems
Togolese music
National symbols of Togo
African anthems
National anthem compositions in D-flat major